Reloaded is the fourth studio album by Canadian hip hop group Rascalz, released in 2002. The album debuted at #22 on the Canadian Albums Chart. The single was also a success in Germany reaching #14 on the German Black Music Chart. Reloaded was among the top 30 best-selling rap albums in Canada in 2002 and the third best-selling rap album of the year by a Canadian rap artist.

Track listing
 "Intro"
 "Jungle"
 "Crazy World" (feat. Notch and Sazon Diamonte)
 "Stop Drop"
 "One Shot" (feat. K-os)
 "Warrior" (feat. Notch)
 "Dun Did It" (feat. IRS & Tara Chase)
 "Interlude"
 "Movie Star"
 "Flithy" (feat. Checkmate & Concise)
 "Clash (We Don't Play)" (feat. Sugar Prince & Jah-Fus)
 "Fiyah!" (feat. East Juvi & Kardinal Offishall)
 "Send Fi Dem"
 "Hit Em Up" (feat. Kardinal Offishall, Solitair & YLook)
 "Respect It" (feat. Mag-T from Grimmi Grimmi)
 "Murderah" (feat. Jah-Fus)
 "Politricks (Outro)"

Year-end charts

References

2002 albums
Albums produced by Tone Mason
Rascalz albums